Nicklaus O'Leary (born August 31, 1992) is a former American football tight end. He was drafted by the Buffalo Bills in the sixth round of the 2015 NFL Draft. He played college football at Florida State.

Early life
O'Leary is one of five children of Bill and Nan (Nicklaus) O'Leary. He attended Dwyer High School in Palm Beach Gardens, Florida, where he played football and lacrosse. He won state titles in both football and lacrosse. As a senior, he had 51 receptions for 875 yards and 12 touchdowns. Considered a four-star recruit by Rivals.com, he was listed as the top-ranked tight end recruit in his class.

College career

As a true freshman in 2011, O'Leary played in all 13 games with two starts. He finished the season with 12 receptions for 164 yards and one touchdown. As a sophomore in 2012, he started 11 of 13 games, recording 21 receptions for 252 yards and three touchdowns. As a junior in 2013, he was a John Mackey Award finalist after recording 33 receptions for 557 yards with seven touchdowns. After considering entering the 2014 NFL Draft, O'Leary returned to Florida State for his senior season. During his senior season, he set Florida State's record for career receptions for a tight end. He again was a finalist for the John Mackey Award, this time winning it. He was also named a consensus All-American. O'Leary finished the season with 48 receptions for 618 yards and six touchdowns. For his career, O'Leary had 114 receptions for 1,591 yards and 17 touchdowns.

College statistics

Professional career

Buffalo Bills
O'Leary was drafted by the Buffalo Bills in the sixth round (194th overall) of the 2015 NFL Draft.

On September 8, 2015, the Bills cut O'Leary and re-signed him to the practice squad two days later. On December 8, 2015, he was promoted to the active roster after Matthew Mulligan was cut.

On November 12, 2017, in a 47–10 loss to the New Orleans Saints, he caught his first career touchdown, a seven-yard pass from quarterback Nathan Peterman.

On September 1, 2018, O'Leary was released by the Bills.

Miami Dolphins
On September 20, 2018, O'Leary was signed to the Miami Dolphins' practice squad. He was promoted to the active roster on October 5, 2018. He scored his first touchdown with the Dolphins in Week 6 against the Bears on a five-yard pass from Brock Osweiler. On December 1, 2018, O'Leary signed a one-year contract extension with the Dolphins through the 2019 season.

On October 29, 2019, O’Leary was released by the Dolphins.

Jacksonville Jaguars
On November 18, 2019, O'Leary was signed by the Jacksonville Jaguars.

Las Vegas Raiders
On April 6, 2020, O'Leary was signed by the Las Vegas Raiders. He was placed on the reserve/non-football injury list on May 28, 2020. On June 23, 2020, it was revealed that O'Leary underwent a heart procedure because there was a 100% blockage in one artery adjacent with the heart. Some sources surfaced that O'Leary was retiring from football, but O'Leary still intended to play in 2021, regardless of his recent procedure.

Professional statistics

Personal life
O'Leary's maternal grandfather is golfing legend Jack Nicklaus. Nick's father, Bill, was a highly recruited tight end who played at the University of Georgia, and his mother, Nan, played volleyball at Georgia.

References

External links
Miami Dolphins bio
Florida State Seminoles bio

1992 births
Living people
People from North Palm Beach, Florida
Players of American football from Florida
Sportspeople from the Miami metropolitan area
American football tight ends
Florida State Seminoles football players
All-American college football players
Buffalo Bills players
Miami Dolphins players
Jacksonville Jaguars players
Las Vegas Raiders players